Tibbie is a census-designated place and unincorporated community in Washington County, Alabama, United States. Its population was 41 as of the 2010 census.

The Red Alabama Blackmouth Cur is thought to have originated in the area around Tibbie in the 1940s.

Demographics

History
The name Tibbie comes from a shortened form of the Choctaw word "oakibbeha". Oakibbeha means "blocks of ice therein," with okti meaning "ice" and the plural form abeha meaning "to be in".

A post office first began operations under the name Tibbie in 1910.

References

Census-designated places in Washington County, Alabama
Census-designated places in Alabama
Alabama placenames of Native American origin